The 1930–31 season was the 39th season of The Football League.

Final league tables

The tables and results below are reproduced here in the exact form that they can be found at The Rec.Sport.Soccer Statistics Foundation website and in Rothmans Book of Football League Records 1888–89 to 1978–79, with home and away statistics separated.

Beginning with the season 1894–95, clubs finishing level on points were separated according to goal average (goals scored divided by goals conceded), or more properly put, goal ratio. In case one or more teams had the same goal difference, this system favoured those teams who had scored fewer goals. The goal average system was eventually scrapped beginning with the 1976–77 season. From the 1922–23 season, re-election was required of the bottom two teams of both Third Division North and Third Division South.

Eight teams, Arsenal, Aston Villa, Sheffield Wednesday (1st Div), Everton (2nd Div.), Chesterfield, Lincoln City, Tranmere Rovers (3rd Div. North) and Crystal Palace (3rd Div. South) all scored over 100 goals. This is the most in Football League history.

Arsenal scored 60 away goals, the most to this day., while the 128 goals scored by Aston Villa remains a top flight record, and a record for any 42 game season.

First Division

Results

Maps

Second Division

Results

Maps

Third Division North

Results

Maps

Third Division South

Results

Maps

Records
For these and other records, see:

See also
1930-31 in English football
1930 in association football
1931 in association football

References

Ian Laschke: Rothmans Book of Football League Records 1888–89 to 1978–79. Macdonald and Jane’s, London & Sydney, 1980.

English Football League seasons
Eng
1930–31 in English football leagues